The speckled worm-eel,  Myrophis punctatus, is a member of the Ophichthidae (snake eel) family. It was described by Christian Frederik Lütken in 1852. M. punctatus have brown bodies that are lighter on the ventral side than the dorsal side. The upper body is speckled with pepper-like black spots. The snout is pointed. This species has regenerative powers.

Habitat/Distribution
Depth range 0.4m-750m 
Temperature range 6.975 oC – 27.717 oC
The speckled worm eel is a benthic species. It lives in tropical marine and brackish habitats that range from seagrass beds and mangroves to offshore reefs. They are found in the Western Atlantic around the island of Bermuda and from North Carolina to Brazil and throughout the Gulf of Mexico, the West Indies, and the coast of Central America, and all through the Caribbean.

Reproduction
This species makes significant seasonal migrations. They migrate to the sea to spawn. They have leptocephalus larvae. Usually only juveniles are found inshore. They appear along the coast between December and May from drifting in from offshore spawning areas.

Other information
They are caught as baitfish along the northern Brazilian coast using ichthyotoxic plants. Locomotion type: Balistiform Lobotes surinamensis and Thunnus thynnus thynnus feed on Myrophis punctatus.

References

Myrophis
Fish described in 1852
Fish of the Atlantic Ocean